Minaville is a hamlet in the Town of Florida in Montgomery County, New York, United States. It is located on New York State Route 30 (NY 30).

References

Geography of Montgomery County, New York
Hamlets in Montgomery County, New York